A small number of municipalities in Serbia held local elections in 2005 for mayors, assembly members, or both. These were not part of the country's regular cycle of local elections but instead took place in certain jurisdictions where either the local government had fallen or the term of the municipal assembly had expired.

Serbia had introduced the direct election of mayors in 2002. This practice was abandoned with the 2008 Serbian local elections, but it was still in effect in 2005, and some mayor by-elections took place during the year. The constituent municipalities of Belgrade did not have directly elected mayors, and in these jurisdictions mayors were chosen by the elected assembly members. 

All assembly elections were held under proportional representation with a three per cent electoral threshold. Successful lists were required to receive three per cent of all votes, not only of valid votes.

Results

Vojvodina

Bačka Palanka
The Bačka Palanka municipal assembly was not properly constituted after the 2004 Serbian local elections, and a new election took place in December 2005. The full results do not appear to be available online. The preliminary results were:

Bečej
Bečej mayor Đorđe Predin was defeated in a recall election in December 2005.

A by-election to selection Predin's replacement was held in early 2006. Peter Knezi of the Alliance of Vojvodina Hungarians had previously served as deputy mayor and may have been acting mayor during the election period.

Central Serbia (excluding Belgrade)

Niš
Niš mayor Smiljko Kostić remained in office following a recall election on 4 December 2005.

Smederevo
Smederevo mayor Jasna Avramović was defeated in a recall election on 25 December 2005. The preliminary results were:

An election to determine her successor as mayor was held in 2006.

References

Local elections in Serbia
2005 elections in Serbia